Julien Abraham (born 14 May 1976 in Enghien-les-Bains) is a French film director and screenwriter.

Biography 
Prior becoming a filmmaker, he studied Economics and Management at the Sorbonne. His first film as a director was a documentary "L'odyssée de musiques" in 2001; his feature films followed a decade later.

Filmography 
 La cité rose, 2012
 Made in China, 2019
 Mon frère, 2019

References

External links 
 

1976 births
Living people
French film directors
French screenwriters